Jay Stapley (born 13 April 1957) is a British musician.

Career
Stapley started his musical career playing with local bands in Kent and Sussex in the UK. In 1978 he became involved in the London music scene and became a session player and gigging guitarist. He worked alongside various artists and producers on international tours with Roger Waters and Mike Oldfield, the film Withnail and I, and on the albums of Suede, Toyah and Scott Walker. 
 
In 1983 while performing live work with Julian Dawson in Germany, he met producer René Tinner and began working in Tinner's Cologne studio to record guitar tracks for various projects.

Stapley also recorded and toured with Westernhagen, and became his co-producer and musical director.

During the 1990s Stapley recorded four instrumental CDs for WEA. In 2008 CD he released his most recent recording, Edge of the World. He specialises in acoustic and instrumental works.

Stapley has worked with Roland Corporation and Digidesign, demonstrating guitar equipment for both companies. He built his own studio in London where he produces music CDs, as well as television and film scores. he has taught privately, and became one of the first teachers at the Guitar Institute (now called The Institute of Contemporary Music Performance, ICMP). In 2011 he launched the record label Dammit Music, specialising in unusual music projects and contemporary works with singer/songwriters and acoustic music.

Musical history

1979–Present
Guitarist/Musical Director/Backing Vocals. Recording sessions and international tours with artists including Roger Waters, Mike Oldfield, Suede, Scott Walker, Slim Whitman, David Allen Coe, Kirsty MacColl, David Dundas, Westernhagen, David Mead, Henning Staerk, Toyah Wilcox, Bucks Fizz, Peter Jay, Michael Kamen, etc. Film + TV soundtracks including "Withnail and I", "How to get Ahead in Advertising", "Hale and Pace", "The Duty Men", etc.
1981–1993	
Whilst working at Roland, Stapley developed and delivered staff training on guitar-based products including guitar synthesizers, samplers, synths, effects processors, sequencers, etc.  Developed and delivered product demonstrations of hardware and software at international trade shows.
1986–2005
During this time Stapley made 7 Platinum Discs, and was co-producer/musician on various CDs for German artist Westernhagen
1991–Present
Westernhagen (Million-selling CDs), Ian Hunt, Wives and Servants, George Frakes, The Cry Baby, Lou Cowell, Pat Orchard, Bill Conlon, Bacardi Europe Cinema Ad, etc.
1996–Present
Audio Editor/Sound Design non-musical industry sectors.	
Audio editing/recording/sound design for SDL, Teletubbies, PlayStation games (various) CD-ROMs (various) voice-recording for TFL, EDS, Thales Information Systems, Interalia, Information on Hold, BBC, etc.	
1997–Present
Technical Director of Dammit Ltd, responsible for studio management, audio engineering, production, script consultancy, software development.
2010–Present
Director of Dammit Music, responsible for A&R, production, marketing and artist development.
1991–1995
At the Guitar Institute Stapley developed elements of syllabus, administered grades, and administered Live Performance Workshops	
1993–1997	
Stapley developed and delivered product demonstrations for Digidesign of industry-standard "ProTools" hard-disc recording software at international trade shows.
2004
At Guitar X Stapley also developed and taught Music Technology course and administered Live Performance Workshops
2008
At the ICMP (institute of Contemporary Music Performance), London Stapley was teaching Guitar skills, live performance skills, studio technology. Writing Degree-level course materials and teaching at degree-level.

Discography

 Radio K.A.O.S. (1987) - album by Roger Waters
 Southern Fried (1986) - album by Tim Stone / Jay Stapley
 Blue Lotus (1991) - album by Jay Stapley
 Tower Of Babel (1992) - album by Jay Stapley
 Wanderlust (1994) - album by Jay Stapley
 Ambient Blues (1996) - album by Jay Stapley
 Edge Of The World (2008) - album by Jay Stapley
 Plans For Love (2006) - album by Wives & Servants

References

1957 births
Living people
British male guitarists